The Communication Services and General Workers Trade Union was a trade union in Trinidad and Tobago that transferred its daily paid members to the National Union of Government Employees in 1959. The Union no longer exists.

See also
 List of trade unions
 Federated Workers Trade Union
 National Union of Government and Federated Workers

References

Defunct trade unions of Trinidad and Tobago